Holzkirchen refers to the following places in Bavaria, Germany:

 Holzkirchen, Lower Franconia
 Holzkirchen, Upper Bavaria